The state funeral of late President of the Republic of Macedonia Boris Trajkovski who died in a plane crash in Bosnia and Herzegovina was held on 5 March 2004 in Skopje. President Trajkovski was buried in the Alley of Great Man in Skopje, and the funeral was attended by 47 foreign delegations, including 18 heads of state and government.

Lying in state
Trajkovski's body lay in state in the building of Macedonian Parliament from the arrival from Bosnia and Herzegovina 3 March until the funeral day. On 4 March from 9.00 AM to 11.00 PM the body was available for everyone interested to pay their last respects. On the funeral day, 5 March, foreign delegations paid respect from 9.00 AM until 12.00 AM.

List of dignitaries

Heads of states and governments
 Ferenc Mádl (President)
 Stjepan Mesić (President)
 Aleksander Kwaśniewski (President)
 Thomas Klestil (President)
 Václav Klaus (President)
 Svetozar Marovic (President)
 Sulejman Tihic (President)
 Rudolf Schuster (President)
 Georgi Parvanov (President)
 Ion Iliescu (President)
 Filip Vujanovic (President)
 Leonid Kuchma (President)
 Alfred Moisiu (President)
 Viktor Yanukovych (Prime Minister)
 Milo Đukanović (Prime Minister)
 Vojislav Koštunica (Prime Minister)
 Kjell Magne Bondevik (Prime Minister)
 Fatos Nano (Prime Minister)

Government members
 Goran Svilanović-(Minister of Foreign Affairs)
 Dragan Primorac- (Minister of Science, Education and Sports)
 Denis Mackshane- (Minister for Europe)
 Valerian Cristea (Deputy Prime Minister)
 Tassos Yiannitsis (Minister of Foreign Affairs)
 Uldis Vitolins (Minister of Defence)
 Michael Smith (Minister of Defence)
 Mladen Ivanić (Minister of Foreign Affairs)
 Bariša Čolak-(Minister of Security)
 Sergey Razov (Deputy minister of foreign affairs)
 Louis Michel (Minister of foreign affairs)
 Joschka Fischer (Minister of foreign affairs)
 Ali Ahani (Deputy-Foreign Minister for European and American Affairs)
 Mircea Geoană (Minister of Foreign Affairs)

International organizations
 Romano Prodi (President of the European Commission)
 Jaap de Hoop Scheffer (General secretary)
OSCE Ján Kubiš (General Secretary), Solomon Passy (Chairman)
UNMIK Harry Holkeri (Chief of delegation)

References

2004 in the Republic of Macedonia
Trajkovski, Boris
Trajkovski, Boris